La Gaceta may refer to
 La Gaceta (Honduras), the official journal of the Republic of Honduras.
 La Gaceta (Tampa), a trilingual newspaper in Tampa, Florida, United States
 La Gaceta (Tucumán), a newspaper in San Miguel de Tucumán, Argentina
 La Gaceta (Spain), a Spanish newspaper
 La Gaceta Mexicana, a Mexican-American newspaper published in Houston, Texas, United States
 La Gaceta de Panamá, a Panamanian digital newspaper

See also 
 The Gazette (disambiguation)